Nathan Harris (born 1880) was an American baseball player.

Nathan or Nate Harris may also refer to:

 Nathan J. Harris (1864–1936), Utah lawyer, judge, and politician
 Nate Harris (born 1983), American football player
 Nathan Harris (rugby union) (born 1992), New Zealand rugby union player
 Nathan Harris (novelist), American novelist
 Nate Harris (Criminal Minds), fictional character in Criminal Minds (season 2)